Goran Milosavijevic (born 11 April 1967) is a footballer who played as a midfielder in the Football League for Chester City. Besides Serbia, he has played in France and England.

References

Chester City F.C. players
Association football midfielders
English Football League players
Living people
1967 births
Sportspeople from Kraljevo
Expatriate footballers in England
Yugoslav footballers
Yugoslav expatriate footballers